Mari Ruti is Distinguished Professor of critical theory and of gender and sexuality studies at the University of Toronto in Toronto, Ontario, Canada. She is an interdisciplinary scholar within the theoretical humanities working at the intersection of contemporary theory, continental philosophy, psychoanalytic theory, cultural studies, trauma theory, posthumanist ethics, and gender and sexuality studies.

Ruti holds an MA and a PhD from the Comparative Literature Department at Harvard University, an MA from the Harvard Sociology Department, and a Diplôme d’Études Approfondies (DEA) from Paris Diderot University, where she was a student of Julia Kristeva. She also holds a BA from Brown University.

Early life
Ruti grew up in rural Finland adjacent to the Finland-Russia border. Ruti moved to the US at age 20.

Career 
In 2000-2004, Ruti held a lectureship at Harvard's Program for Studies of Women, Gender, and Sexuality, also serving as the program's assistant director. She arrived at the University of Toronto in 2004, was tenured in 2008, promoted to full professor in 2013, and promoted to Distinguished Professor in 2017. Ruti's undergraduate courses focus on contemporary theory, literary criticism, cultural studies, film theory, psychoanalysis, trauma theory, and feminist theory. Her English graduate seminars focus on contemporary theory, continental philosophy, psychoanalytic theory, posthumanist ethics, trauma and affect theory. She also teaches the annual graduate seminar on queer theory at The Mark S. Bonham Centre for Sexual Diversity Studies (SDS). This seminar is the core requirement for the SDS Graduate Certificate, and it draws a diverse group of graduate students from both the humanities and the social sciences.

In 2011-2015, Ruti held a Canadian Government Social Sciences and Humanities Research Council (SSHRC) Standard Research Grant of $70,000. In 2017-2021, she holds an SSHRC Insight Grant of $104,000. Ruti co-edits the Psychoanalytic Horizons Book Series for Bloomsbury Press. In 2016-2017, Ruti was Visiting Professor and Director of Graduate Studies at the Harvard Program for Studies of Women, Gender, and Sexuality.

Research 
Ruti's scholarship addresses questions of subjectivity, relationality, psychic life, desire, affect, power, agency, autonomy, creativity, oppression, social change, and contemporary ethics. Some of her books take a philosophical and contemplative approach, exploring subjective experience, psychic life, self-transformation, and the quest for personal meaning. For example, in The Call of Character she looks at the processes through which individuals develop a distinctive character; how they decide what they most value in life; how they grow through relationships; and how love, loss, hardship, disenchantment, and the necessities of mourning shape the contours of who they are. She has also written extensively on the ethics of the self-other relationship, including the dilemmas generated by the unreadability, unpredictability, and radical vulnerability of others.

Ruti's more politically oriented scholarship, such as Between Levinas and Lacan, examines questions of social power, oppression, and agency; the impact of social inequalities and collective toxins on psychic and affective life; personal and collective trauma; bad feelings such as anxiety and depression; and the psychic and political processes that allow individuals to cope with adverse circumstances and sometimes even translate pain into personal meaning. She is particularly interested in how subordinated individuals––individuals subjected to poverty, sexism, racism, homophobia, and various personal traumas––come to attain enough critical distance from their surroundings to be able to resist the collective forces that oppress them. For this reason, the complexities of agency, particularly the relationship between subjection and autonomy, have long been central to her scholarship.

Some of Ruti's politically oriented work is motivated by her background of having grown up in poverty without running water, book learning, or emotional support. She has made a lifelong mission of "working through" this experience in order to lead a livable (and sometimes even a good) life by writing books that address related themes.

Ruti's recent scholarship on feminist and queer theory (in Feminist Film Theory and "Pretty Woman" and The Ethics of Opting Out) investigates biopolitics; neoliberalism; postfeminism; contemporary ideals of femininity; new forms of heteropatriarchy; female self-objectification; queer antinormativity; queer negativity/pessimism; queer utopianism/optimism; queer discourses of failure and bad feelings; the relationship between queer theory and affect theory; and ethical debates within queer theory.

Books 
 Critical Theory Between Klein and Lacan: A Dialogue (New York: Bloomsbury, 2019, with Amy Allen). 
 Distillations: Theory, Ethics, Affect (New York: Bloomsbury, 2018).
 Penis Envy and Other Bad Feelings: The Emotional Costs of Everyday Life (New York: Columbia University Press, 2018). 
 The Ethics of Opting Out: Queer Theory's Defiant Subjects (New York: Columbia University Press, 2017).
 Feminist Film Theory and "Pretty Woman" (New York: Bloomsbury Press, 2016).
 Between Levinas and Lacan: Self, Other, Ethics (New York: Bloomsbury Press, 2015). 
 The Age of Scientific Sexism: How Evolutionary Psychology Promotes Gender Profiling and Fans the Battle of the Sexes (New York: Bloomsbury Press, 2015). 
 The Call of Character: Living a Life Worth Living (New York: Columbia University Press, 2013).
 The Singularity of Being: Lacan and the Immortal Within (New York: Fordham University Press, 2012). 
 The Summons of Love (New York: Columbia University Press, 2011).
 The Case for Falling in Love: Why We Can’t Master the Madness of Love––and Why That’s the Best Part (Naperville, IL: Sourcebooks, 2011).
 A World of Fragile Things: Psychoanalysis and the Art of Living (Albany, NY: SUNY Press, 2009). 
 Reinventing the Soul: Posthumanist Theory and Psychic Life (New York: Other Press, 2006).

References 

Brown University alumni
Harvard University alumni
Academic staff of the University of Toronto
Year of birth missing (living people)
Living people
Canadian philosophers
Finnish emigrants to Canada